Artemis Spanou (born 1 January 1993) is a Greek American basketball player for UNI Győr and the Greek national team.

She participated at the EuroBasket Women 2017.

Statistics

Source

References

External links

1993 births
Living people
Greek women's basketball players
Power forwards (basketball)
Greek expatriate basketball people in Spain
Greek expatriate basketball people in Turkey
Greek expatriate basketball people in the United States
Greek expatriate basketball people in Hungary
Greek expatriate basketball people in Poland
Robert Morris Colonials women's basketball players
People from Rhodes
Sportspeople from the South Aegean